West Coast Mafia is a compilation album by rap artist C-Bo, released July 23, 2002, on West Coast Mafia Records.

Track listing

Album chart positions

References 

2002 compilation albums
Albums produced by Bosko
Albums produced by Rick Rock
C-Bo albums
Gangsta rap compilation albums